Orsa is a locality and the seat of Orsa Municipality, Dalarna County, Sweden, with 5,308 inhabitants (2010). Inlandsbanan and European route E45 run through the town and the railroad Bollnäs-Orsa connects.

Nature

The southern parts of Orsa are characterized by the Siljan Ring, the ring of lakes and rivers in northern Dalarna formed by the big meteorite strike 365 million years ago. In central Orsa, at the outflow of river Oreälven a sand bank has been built up, in these days enjoyed by thousands of visitors and the inhabitants of Orsa. The big forests start just north of the town of Orsa, with the sparsely populated Orsa finnmark, to which many Finns emigrated during the 17th century.

Worth seeing
 
 Orsa Spelmän, (Orsa folklore musicians) which Benny Andersson from ABBA used to play with.
 Skattungbyn a small village with a view over the river Oreälven.
 Orsayran (The Orsa Dizzying) a summer music festival, each Wednesday in July.
 Orsa slipstensmuseum a museum of the making of the famous grindstones of Orsa, located in Mässbacken.
 Orsa Grönklitt. A wilderness center with wilderness activities, bear and animal park during the summer and a ski resort during the winter.

Orsamål dialect

About 500 people speak the Orsamål dialect, an Old Scandinavian language, which is a variant of Dalecarlian, also called Old Swedish in Minnesota, USA.

Climate

International relations

Twin towns – Sister cities
Orsa is twinned with:
 Aalborg, Denmark

References 

Populated places in Dalarna County
Municipal seats of Dalarna County
Swedish municipal seats
Populated places in Orsa Municipality

fi:Orsan kunta